Abraham Kafati Díaz (born 27 April 1948) is a Honduran businessman and politician. He currently serves as deputy of the National Congress of Honduras, representing the National Party of Honduras for the department of El Paraíso.

Díaz is one of 6 deputies returned from El Paraíso, and was elected with 13.28% of the overall vote for the department.

References

1948 births
Living people
People from El Paraíso Department
Honduran businesspeople
Deputies of the National Congress of Honduras
National Party of Honduras politicians